Physalaemus centralis is a species of frog in the family Leptodactylidae.
It is found in Bolivia, Brazil, and Paraguay.
Its natural habitats are moist savanna, subtropical or tropical moist shrubland, subtropical or tropical seasonally wet or flooded lowland grassland, freshwater marshes, and intermittent freshwater marshes.
It is threatened by habitat loss.

References

centralis
Taxonomy articles created by Polbot
Amphibians described in 1962